Valery Zhironovich Tsnobiladze (born Vorkuta, 3 November 1980) is a Russian rugby union player who plays as a hooker. He is of Georgian descent.

Tsnobiladze played for Krasny Yar Krasnoyarsk (2004), RC Novokuznetsk (2005–2011), and Yenisey-STM Krasnoyarsk (2011–2013). He plays once again for Krasny Yar Krasnoyarsk since 2013.

He had 43 caps for Russia, from 2010 to 2018, scoring 5 tries, 25 points on aggregate. He had his debut at the 40–20 loss to Argentina Jaguars, at 23 October 2010, in Moscow, in a tour, aged 29 years old. He was called for the 2011 Rugby World Cup, playing in two games, one of them as a substitute. He was suspended after headbutting an adversary player in the game with Ireland, in a 62–12 loss. He returned to the national team afterwards and was a regular player until his last game, at the 57–3 win over Germany, at 18 March 2018, in Cologne, for the 2019 Rugby World Cup qualifiers, aged 37 years old.

References

External links
Valery Tsnobiladze International Statistics

1980 births
Living people
Russian rugby union players
Russia international rugby union players
Rugby union hookers
Yenisey-STM Krasnoyarsk players